Charles Reid (born April 12, 1990) is a Canadian snowboarder. He competes in slopestyle and represented Canada in this event at the 2014 Winter Olympics in Sochi where he finished in 22nd place in the Olympic inaugural slopestyle event.

References

1990 births
Living people
Canadian male snowboarders
Sportspeople from Quebec
Snowboarders at the 2014 Winter Olympics
Olympic snowboarders of Canada